The 2012 North Dakota gubernatorial election was held on November 6, 2012 to elect a Governor and Lieutenant Governor of North Dakota, concurrently with the 2012 U.S. presidential election, as well as elections to the United States Senate, elections to the United States House of Representatives and various state and local elections. Incumbent Governor Jack Dalrymple succeeded to the office when then-Governor John Hoeven resigned to take a seat in the U.S. Senate in 2010. Dalrymple, a member of the Republican Party, won election to a full term. Ryan Taylor was the Democratic nominee. Dalrymple prevailed with 63% of the vote.

Republican Party

Candidates
The North Dakota Republican Party selected incumbent Governor Jack Dalrymple as their nominee and incumbent Lieutenant Governor Drew Wrigley was his running mate. Dalrymple defeated Fargo architect Paul Sorum who later ran as an Independent.

Declined
 Ed Schafer, former Governor of North Dakota and former U.S. Secretary of Agriculture

Libertarian Party

Candidates
The Libertarian Party of North Dakota selected Roland Riemers, a real estate investor and a failed 2010 candidate for Grand Forks County Sheriff and failed 1996 candidate for president as their candidate.

On July 5, 2012, it was announced that Riemers will not appear on the ballot because his running mate, Richard Ames, failed to file a page of his paperwork.
On September 12, 2012 after being disqualified from appearing on the November ballot, Roland Riemers, a libertarian now running as an independent with Anthony Johns, said in a news release that he’d submitted more than 1,100 signatures to the secretary of state. The pair appears on the ballot certified by the secretary on Monday.  Roland Riemers has filed a lawsuit to have the other candidates removed from the ballot.

Democratic-NPL Party

Candidates
The North Dakota Democratic-NPL Party selected rancher and North Dakota Senate Minority Leader Ryan Taylor as their nominee. Ellen Chaffee was his running mate.

General election

Debates
Complete video of debate, October 5, 2012 - C-SPAN

Predictions

Polling

Results

References

External links
 North Dakota Secretary of State

Official campaign websites
 Jack Dalrymple for Governor
 Ryan Taylor for Governor

North Dakota
2012
Gubernatorial